"You're on Your Own, Kid" is a song by American singer-songwriter Taylor Swift, taken from her tenth studio album, Midnights (2022). Written and produced by Swift and Jack Antonoff, the song combines alternative rock, pop rock, and synth-pop styles; it has an upbeat production containing muted guitars and synthesizers that gradually build up. In the lyrics, a narrator reflects on her coming of age of how she dealt with an unrequited love, ambitions to leave her town, and struggles with her social image and self-image.

The song was met with unanimous critical acclaim, receiving praise for both it's vulnerability and hopeful message towards it's conclusion. Critics interpreted "You're on Your Own, Kid" as Swift's reflection of her journey to fame, past relationships, her discography as well as an eating disorder she suffered. The song charted in the top 10 of charts in Australia, Canada, Malaysia, the Philippines, Singapore, and the United States, and peaked at number seven on the Billboard Global 200.

Background and release 
On August 28, 2022, during her acceptance speech for Video of the Year for All Too Well: The Short Film at the 2022 MTV Video Music Awards, singer-songwriter Taylor Swift announced her tenth studio album, set to be released on October 21. Swift later revealed the name of the album, Midnights, and its album cover on social networks but the tracklist was not immediately revealed. Jack Antonoff, a musician who has worked with Swift since 1989 (2014), was revealed as one of the producers of the album through a video she posted on her Instagram account on September 6, 2022, titled, "The making of Midnights". On September 21, about a month before the album's release, Swift announced a thirteen episode series called Midnights Mayhem with Me that will be released on the social media platform TikTok, and in each episode the name of one track from the album will be revealed. The tenth episode was released a few days later, in which Swift revealed the fifth track from the album, "You're on Your Own, Kid". The song alongside the thirteen announced tracks and additional surprise-released tracks for the 3am edition of Midnights, was released on October 21, 2022 under Republic Records. The "Strings Remix" of the song was included on the CD Deluxe edition of the album.

Composition and lyrics 
"You're on Your Own, Kid" is 3:14 in length. The song features persistent electric guitar strums throughout. It begins with soft, muted percussion beats, plucked guitars, and subtle synthesizers, which gradually build up. In the refrains, after the lyrics, "You're on your own kid, you always have been", the instrumental comes to a halt, contrasting with what Slant Magazine's Paul Attard found to be a "relentless pre-chorus". In reviews of Midnights, critics described the genre as alternative rock, alternative pop, and pop rock. Rob Sheffield, in a ranking of Swift's songs, called "You're on Your Own, Kid" a synth-pop track reminiscent of the music by rock band New Order. Ilana Kaplan from the Alternative Press described the production as " '90s-alt-rock-tigned".

The lyrics address a narrator's reflection on her coming of age. The narrator reminisces about her teenage years in her hometown, dreaming of getting out and using songwriting as a means to create her own fantasy. The first verse has her recalling an unrequited love in the past: "Summer went away / Still the yearning stays / I play it cool with the best of them / I wait patiently / He's gonna notice me / It's ok, we're the best of friends." Time's Shannon Carlin found this to be in line with the theme of unrequited love on Swift's previous songs including "You Belong with Me" and "Hey Stephen" from Fearless (2008). The second verse sees her moving on from the boy and chasing her career aspirations, just to realize: "My dreams aren't rare." When she returns for a homecoming, her friends ignore her and have moved on with their lives. Towards the end, the song concludes with a hopeful message of self-reflection; the narrator looks around in a "blood-soaked gown" and reckons that every misstep was a lesson learnt: "So make the friendship bracelets/ Take the moment and taste it/ You've got no reason to be afraid."

Critics interpreted "You're on Your Own, Kid" as Swift's self-reflection on her past and journey to celebrity. PopMatters's Matthew Dwyer considered the song Swift's contemplation about her legacy in the music industry, citing the lyric, "I gave my blood, sweat, and tears for this." John Wohlmacher from Beats Per Minute found the lyrics dark but the musical composition somewhat brighter, and so "it feels like Swift is using pop music to cast a shadow over the brightly illuminated truths within her lyrics". For Atwood Magazine's Nic Nichols, "You're on Your Own, Kid" shares similar themes with Swift's 2008 song "Fifteen". The lines, "I hosted parties and starved my body/ Like I'd be saved by a perfect kiss", were deciphered as her mentioning her eating disorder, which is also documented in Miss Americana (2020).

Critical reception 
"You're On Your Own, Kid" was met with universal acclaim. Stephen Thompson of NPR praised the lyrics' specificity and imagery, and the "gorgeous" melody that showcase Swift's talents as a great songwriter. Attard considered "You're on Your Own, Kid" one of the Midnights tracks that best display the "matured temperament and the stark intimacy of Swift’s songwriting", and The Guardian critic Alexis Petridis selected it among the songs that are "filled with subtle, brilliant touches". Kate Solomon from i praised the track as the album's most emotionally affecting. In Variety, Chris Willman ranked "You're on Your Own, Kid" at number 49 on his list of the best 50 songs from Swift's repertoire, specifically praising the lyrics.

Commercial performance 
Following the release of Midnights, tracks of the album occupied the entire top 10 of the US Billboard Hot 100; "You're on Your Own, Kid" opened at number eight on the chart, with 34.1 million streams, 1,500 downloads, and 498,000 airplay impressions. The tracks made Swift the first artist to occupy the top 10 of the Hot 100 and the woman with the most top 10 entries (40), surpassing Madonna (38). It peaked at number six on the Canadian Hot 100 and was certified platinum by Music Canada. In the United Kingdom, the song reached number 65 on the UK Singles Chart and received a silver certification from the British Phonographic Industry (BPI). 

Elsewhere, "You're on Your Own, Kid" debuted on numerous territories, peaking within the top 40 of Australia (6), the Philippines (6), Singapore (6), Malaysia (7), Iceland (13), Vietnam (13), Croatia (18), India (19), South Africa (19), New Zealand (20), Luxembourg (22), Lithuania (24), Czech Republic (26), Sweden (27), Switzerland (27), Slovakia (32), Norway (34), Hungary (36), Spain (39), and Denmark (40), and further reaching Italy (82), Argentina (98), and France (107). The song ultimately debuted and peaked at number seven on the Billboard Global 200.

Credits and personnel 
Credits are adapted from Pitchfork.
Recording
 Recorded at Rough Customer Studio (Brooklyn) and Electric Lady Studios (New York City)
 Mixed at MixStar Studios (Virginia Beach)
 Mastered at Sterling Sound (Edgewater, New Jersey)
 Evan Smith's performance was recorded by herself at Pleasure Hill Recording (Portland, Maine)
 Sean Hutchinson's performance was recorded by himself at Hutchinson Sound (Brooklyn)

 Personnel
 Taylor Swift – vocals, songwriter, producer
 Jack Antonoff – songwriter, producer, programming, assistant mix engineer, percussion, Juno 6, Mellotron, Moog, electric guitars, bass, background vocals, recording
  Evan Smith – synths, recording
 Sean Hutchinson – drums, percussion, recording
 Megan Searl – assistant engineer
 Jon Sher – assistant engineer
 John Rooney – assistant engineer
 Serban Ghenea – mix engineer
 Bryce Bordone – assistant mix engineer
 Randy Merrill – mastering engineer
 Laura Sisk – recording

Charts

Certifications

References

2022 songs
Taylor Swift songs
Songs written by Taylor Swift
Songs written by Jack Antonoff
Song recordings produced by Taylor Swift
Song recordings produced by Jack Antonoff
American pop rock songs
American alternative rock songs
American synth-pop songs